Bollywood Hungama (lit. "Bollywood Madness" in Hindi), previously known as IndiaFM (or IndiaFM.com), is a Bollywood entertainment website, owned by Hungama Digital Media Entertainment, which acquired the website in 2000. 

The website provides news related to the Indian film industry, particularly Bollywood, film reviews and box office reports. Launched on 15 June 1998, the website was originally named "IndiaFM.com". It changed its name to "Bollywood Hungama" in 2008.

References

External links

1998 establishments in Maharashtra
Hindi cinema
Companies based in Mumbai
Indian film websites
Internet properties established in 1998